The Pāratarājas (Brahmi:  Pāratarāja, Kharosthi: 𐨤𐨪𐨟𐨪𐨗 , , "Kings of Pārata") or Pāradarājas was a dynasty of Parthian kings from western Pakistan, from circa 125 CE to circa 300 CE. They appear to be a tribal polity of Western Iranic heritage.

Sources 
Ancient history of Balochistan is scarcely documented. The polity is essentially known through their coinage which have been primarily found in and around the district of Loralai, Balochistan, western Pakistan.

Coinage 

The coinage was first studied by E. J. Rapson in 1905 before being subject to a comprehensive evaluation by B. N. Mukherjee in 1972; they have been since superseded by Pankoj Tandon's analyses alongside Harry Falk.

Coinage was issued in five denominations: didrachms, drachms, hemidrachms, quarter drachms, and obols. However all rulers did not issue every denomination. The first six rulers minted stable denominations in silver, before they were devalued and then gave way to billon followed by copper. Tandon notes multiple similarities with Indo-Parthian coinage especially in the metrological standards and shape, as well as with the coinage of the Western Satraps, especially in fabric.

The coins exhibit a bust on the obverse, and a swastika — either right-facing or left-facing — on the reverse, circumscribed by a Prakrit legend in Brahmi script (usually silver coins) or Kharoshthi script (usually copper coins). This legend carried the name of the issuer, followed by patronymic, and identification as the "King of Paratas". The die engraver often left the legend incomplete if he ran out of room — a quirk peculiar to the Paratarajas.

Inscriptions 
A couple of contemporary inscriptions refer to the polity. The Paikuli inscription, erected by Narseh (293-302) on his victory over Bahram III, noted an anonymous "Pāradānshah" (King of Pardan) to have been among his many congratulators:

Shapur I's inscription at the Ka'ba-ye Zartosht in Naqsh-i-Rustam, dated to 262 CE, had "P'rtu"/"Pardan" as one of the many provinces of the Sasanian Empire:

In 1926-1927, Aurel Stein commandeered an excavation at the ruins of a Buddhist site at "Tor Dherai" in Loralai and discovered potsherds carrying Prakrit inscriptions, in Brahmi as well as Kharosthi script. Sten Konow, publishing the report about three years later, failed to understand the Brahmi legends but interpreted the Kharosthi legend as:

Yola Mira, while an unknown King at the time of the excavation, has been since determined to be the earliest Parataraja King from coin-finds. The potsherds remain the only non-numismatic evidence for any of the Parataraja rulers.

Classical literature 
No mention of the dynasty is found in extant literature; however classical literature — in Greek, Latin, and Sanskrit — mention of tribal polities, variously named  "Parētakēnoí" (Πᾰρητᾰκηνοί), "Pareitakai/Pareitacae" (Παρειτάκαις), "Parsidai" (Παρ?óδòν > Παρσιδὦν (?)), "Paraetaceni", "Paradene" (Παραδηνή) and "Parada". Tandon accepts Mukherjee's suggestion about all of them referring to the same entity, which gave rise to the dynasty; he cites Datayola's coin-inscriptions in support.

C. 440 BCE, Herodotus described of the Parētakēnoí as one of the Median tribes, collectively ruled by Deiokes. Arrian records Alexander the Great to have encountered the Pareitakai in a Sogdian province; a siege was mounted but eventually their ruler offered submission and was even rewarded with governorship of other provinces. Other contemporary historians — Quintus Curtius Rufus, Strabo, and Plutarch — reiterate the account at large. Isidore of Charax (fl. 0 C.E - ?) noted Paraitakene to be the geographical area beyond Sakastene. The Periplus of the Erythraean Sea (1st century CE) describes the territory of the Parsidai beyond the Ommanitic region, on the coast of Balochistan. The contemporaneous Natural History by Pliny records the Paraetaceni to be between Aria and Parthia. Ptolemy notes Paradene to be a toponym for an interior region of Gedrosia.

Geography 
Classical literature impresses of the Paratarajas being a migrant tribal polity who originated in northwestern Iran or even further east, and migrated across the centuries to the eastern fringes of Parthian territory, where they perhaps reached their zenith as an independent polity. The two inscriptions or the coinage do not document the kingdom to any geographic precision either. 

Nonetheless, most scholars have placed the polity in West Balochistan, west of Turan and east of Siestan, largely catering to individual biases. Tandon challenges this "implicit consensus"; he hypothesizes Shapur I's inscription to have had listed regions in a geographical order from West to East, thereby demarcating Pardan between the inexact provinces of Makran and Hind. Deriving support from the abundant finds of Parataraja coins and potsherds in Loralai, Tandon proposes that the Paratarajas ruled around the district, probably extending in the west to modern-day Quetta (or Kandahar) and in the north-east to modern-day Zhob.

Dating 
There exists no conclusive evidence to date the establishment of Paratarajas in Balochistan. Tandon proposes a rough date of c. 125, hypothesizing on circumstantial evidence:

 The regnal title "Shahi", found in the potsherds and some of the coinage of Yolamira, was revived by Kanishka (c. 127-150 CE).
 The first-recorded use of patronymic legends in the subcontinent, outside of the Paratarajas, is in the coins of Chastana (c. 78 - 130 CE), a Western Kshatrapa.
 The obverse bust featured in the coin of early Paratarajas is near-identical to a rare copper coin type of Rudradaman (c. 130 - 150 CE; successor to Chastana).
 Paleographic analyses of the Brahmi legends place the coins in the second century.

However, the disintegration of Paratarajas can be predicted with more confidence. A couple of overstrikes by Datayola — the last extant Parataraja ruler — on coins of the Kushano-Sasanian ruler Hormizd I provide a terminus post quem of c. 275 C.E. Accepting this schema allots about 15 years per ruler, which fits with the usual norms for ancient dynasties; additionally, Koziya can be assigned to about c. 230, whose incorporation of a bust, adorning curved hem, on the coin obverse can be correlated to the contemporaneous Kanishka II.

History

Rulers 
A rough lineage of Paratarajas rulers can be reconstructed from numismatic evidence as follows:

Overview 
The frequent referencing of Mithra, a Zoroastrian deity, in the name of the rulers lend credence to the origins of the Paratarajas lying in the Far West. Though Zoroastrians by faith in all probabilities, they likely patronaged Buddhism as well. Tandon speculates the Paratarajas to have been Parthian vassals, who declared independence leveraging the weakening of imperial authority and a burgeoning trade with the Roman Empire. 

Nothing of significance can be obtained about their rule except that they flourished as an intermediary state between three major powers — the Kushanas to the north, the Western Satraps to the east, and the Sassanids to the west — for about two centuries. 

Their fall can be correlated to the well-corroborated decline in Indo-Roman trade volume (c. mid-3rd century onward) and then, Shapur II's devastating Eastern Campaign. Nonetheless, Tandon rejects that they were conquered by the Sasanians as early as 262 CE — as attested in Shapur I's inscription — since not only did Parata coins continue to be abundant without exhibiting any abrupt Sassanian influence as in the case of Bactria etc. but also the region was not claimed as a Sassanian territory in future inscriptions like Kartir's, at Naqsh-e Rajab.

Legacy 
From around Loralai, multiple coins carrying an inscription of a certain "śrī rājño sāhi vijayapotasya" ("Of the noble Lord, King Vijayapota") on the reverse have been found; based on the presence of a crescent at the brow of the obverse bust, a terminus post quem of c. 400 corresponding to Sassanian shahanshah Yazdegerd I can be assigned. Despite a marked contrast in the legend and the long gap from Datayola, the common usage of Swastika as the central motif on the reverse and similarity in metrological standards leads Tandon to hypothesize that Vijayapotasya might have been a Parataraja or a ruler from a successor dynasty, who managed to exercise nominal independence despite the strong presence of Sassanians in the region.

Notes

References

Bibliography

External links
Paratarajas coin gallery

Parthian kings
Historical Iranian peoples
History of Balochistan
History of Pakistan